Edwin San Juan (born February 24, 1969) is a Filipino American actor and comedian who is known for sharing his multicultural life experiences, his observational humor and word play and for poking fun at ethnic stereotypes. He is the creator and executive producer of "SlantED Comedy," a showcase of Asian American stand-up comedians televised on Showtime and also performs across the country and internationally.

Career
San Juan's first film appearance was in "I'm Not Like That No More" (2010), a comedy co-starring Felipe Esparza and Paul Rodriguez. He has entertained American troops on the USO tour "Around the World in Eight Days" and has made several TV appearances including Comedy Central's Live at Gotham, "Comics without Borders" on Showtime, "The Payaso Comedy Slam" on both Showtime and Comedy Central, Comics Unleashed with Byron Allen on ABC, UPN's "Live from Hollywood," BET’s Comic View, Galavision’s "Que Locos" and "Loco Comedy Jam," Si TV’s "Latino Laugh Festival," "Inside Joke" and "Latino 101," "Destination Stardom" on NBC, "International Sexy Ladies Show" on G4 TV and also reigned as the grand champion of "Talent Agency" on UPN with nine consecutive victories.

Currently, he performs nightly as resident headliner for Las Vegas LIVE Comedy Club at the V Theater, Planet Hollywood. Las Vegas Weekly named him best comedian on the Las Vegas Strip for 2015.

External links

  SlantEd Comedy-Showtime
 EdwinSanJuan.com

1969 births
Living people
Male actors from Los Angeles
American male television actors
American male film actors
American male comedians
Filipino male comedians
Filipino male television actors
Comedians from California
20th-century American comedians
21st-century American comedians